"Make Me Crazy" is the second and final single by Scandal'us from their debut album Startin' Somethin'. It did not live up to the success of their debut single, "Me, Myself & I", only managing to debut and peak at No. 30 on the Australian ARIA Charts. This was the last release from the band before they broke up in 2002.

Track listing
 Maxi Single
 "Make Me Crazy" (3:15)
 "Make Me Crazy" (Crazy Nights Mix) (3:30)
 "Make Me Crazy" (Wired Meshmix)	(3:26)
 "Make Me Crazy" (KCB Klubbmix) (3:34)
 "Make Me Crazy" (Karaoke Mix) (3:17)

Charts

References

2001 singles
Warner Music Group singles
2001 songs